A Gentleman of the Ring (French:Chouchou poids plume) is a 1926 French silent sports film directed by Gaston Ravel and starring André Roanne, Olga Day and André Lefaur. It was remade as a sound film in 1932.

It was released in Britain in 1927 by Stoll Pictures. The film's sets were designed by Tony Lekain.

Cast
 André Roanne as Chouchou  
 Olga Day as Diana Benson 
 André Lefaur as Le comte Brodelet de Surville 
 Chriss Lee as Jim  
 Juanita de Frézia as La comtesse de Surville  
 Simone Mareuil as Moineau  
 Reine Derns as La femme du manager  
 Pionnier as Battling Tatave  
 Frank Hall as Le sparring-partner  
 Raymond Lauzerte as Une compagne de fête  
 Frédérique Soule as Une compagne de fête  
 Pierrette Raff as Une compagne de fête  
 Nicolas Redelsperger as Une compagne de fête  
 Bernhard as Le manager

References

Bibliography
 Powrie, Phil & Rebillard, Éric. Pierre Batcheff and stardom in 1920s French cinema. Edinburgh University Press, 2009

External links

1926 films
Films directed by Gaston Ravel
French silent films
1920s sports films
French sports films
French black-and-white films
1920s French films
1920s French-language films
Silent sports films